, a Japanese dish, is a type of 
tempura.  It is made by batter-dipping and deep-frying a batch of ingredients such as shrimp bits (or a clump of small-sized shrimp). Kakiage may use other seafood such as small scallops, shredded vegetables or a combination of such ingredients.

General description 

Kakiage is a type of tempura that uses small pieces of seafood, or vegetable or both.

Sometimes the main ingredients are clumps of fish or shellfish that are individually small, or chopped into small pieces.

The variety of seafood used include shrimp, mollusks like scallop, or fish, and can be combined with vegetables such as onion or mitsuba. The kakiage may also use vegetarian ingredients such as carrots, burdock, or onions chopped into matchsticks or into bits.

Preparation 
The lump being fried is shaped into disks, and the kakiage are sometimes described as a "pancake" of sorts. It is also referred to as a type of "fritter".

The recipe may call for gently sliding the dollop of battered ingredients into hot oil, and since it may try to break apart, a spatula may be used to hold it into place until the shape has set. There is a modern-day implement being sold called a kakiage ring to assist in its cooking—a cylindrical, perforated sheet metal mold on a handle.

In traditional preparation, these small pieces breaking apart must be constantly "raked together".

Serving options 
Kakiage may be eaten with tentsuyu or tempura dipping sauce and grated daikon radishes, or with seasoned salt, just like any other type of tempura.

It may also be served as a kakiage donburi or kakiage don, which is a rice bowl dish with a piece of kakiage placed on top of steamed rice. A tendon (tempura bowl) may also include a piece of kakiage among other tempura morsels.

Ingredients used in Japan 
The kakiage typically uses a type of shrimp called  (Metapenaeus spp.), whereas the individual whole shrimp tempura commonly uses both the shiba ebi and saimaki ebi (juvenile kuruma ebi).

Another standard is using a type of small "scallops" called  which are actually the adductor muscles of the bakagai or aoyagi clams (Mactra chinensis).

Kakiage using fresh sakura shrimp are usually offered in the vicinity of Suruga Bay, Shizuoka Prefecture where these are caught, although some recipes may call for the dried sakura shrimp which are more widely available.

Etymology

Scholar  also introduces the same etymology, anecdotally quoting another tempura chef.

History 
 (written 1837–1853) stated that the tempura offered at soba noodle shops at the time used  shrimp (Metapenaeus joyneri).  According to a soba researcher, tempura soba was invented around the Bunsei era (1818–1830), using the shiba ebi shrimp kakiage as topping.

The former shogun Tokugawa Yoshinobu (1837–1913) was a regular customer at the tempura restaurant , where he would order an especially large kakiage, served on a Nabeshima plate.

See also 

 Japanese cuisine
 List of Japanese dishes
 Crispy kangkóng
 Okoy

Explanatory notes

Citations

Footnotes

Bibliography

 

Japanese seafood
Japanese cuisine
Deep fried foods